Frode Thomassen (born 20 April 1967) is a retired Norwegian football midfielder.

He joined Lyn from FK Fauske/Sprint and played four seasons for the senior team, the last one in Eliteserien where he got 3 games. He went on to Stabæk, playing 19 league games.

After working in the Norwegian Ministry of Culture and the administration of Nord University, he was hired in 2017 as managing director of FK Bodø/Glimt.

References

1967 births
Living people
Norwegian footballers
People from Fauske
Lyn Fotball players
Stabæk Fotball players
Eliteserien players
Norwegian First Division players
Association football midfielders
Academic staff of Nord University
Norwegian sports executives and administrators